Heart (stylized as heart) is the seventeenth studio album by the Japanese singer Koda Kumi, released on March 2, 2022, over two years after her previous studio album Re(cord) (2019). The album was released on streaming platforms a month prior to the physical release on February 2.

It was released in four editions: CD only, CD+DVD, CD+Blu-ray and CD+3DVD.  Heart has twelve musical tracks on the CD and seven music videos on the DVD/Blu-ray with a making video of "Sure Shot."  Prior to the album's release, Kumi released five digital songs to help promote the album: "We'll Be OK", "Doo-Bee-Doo-Bop", "To be free", "4 More", and "100 no Kodokutachi e".

Background and release
Heart was originally released on streaming platforms on February 2, a month prior to its physical release. The album was released in four editions: CD only, CD+DVD, CD+Blu-ray and a limited edition CD+3DVD, which was only available to her fan club, Koda Gumi.

The album was preceded by five digital singles: "We'll Be OK", "Doo-Bee-Doo-Bop", "To Be Free", "4 More" and "100 no Kodokutachi e" (100のコドク達へ / To 100 Lonely Souls).

The CD contained seven new tracks, along with the previously released digital singles. The DVD and Blu-ray contained the corresponding music videos for the singles, along with the new video for "Sure Shot" and a dance version of "4 More". The second and third DVD were only released on the CD+3DVD and CD+2Blu-ray fan club editions. The second DVD housed her "20th→21st Anniversary Event" that was performed on December 6, 2021, at Toyosu PIT in Kōtō, Tokyo, along with a behind-the-scenes featurette. The second DVD housed the events she performed at Zepp Tokyo on December 3 and 4.

Promotional activities
To help promote the album, Koda Kumi performed at several live venues. She performed "100 no Kodokutachi e" at Music Fair on December 4, 2021, and Live Empower Children 2022 on February 15, 2022. All of the digital singles were aired on the radio station J-Wave's program "Groove Line" after the music ban was lifted.

"100 no Kodokutachi e" was advertised as the "saddest ballad" Kumi had released throughout her career.

Kumi collaborated with Taiwanese-American artist ØZI for "Outta My Control." For the song "Good Time", she collaborated with Japanese-American artist Ai.

Commercial performance 
Heart debuted and peaked at number 4 on Oricon Daily Albums chart for February 1, 2022.

Track listing

Charts

References

External links
Koda Kumi Official Site

2022 albums
Koda Kumi albums
Avex Group albums